The Nezahualcóyotl Award of Literature in Indigenous Languages  (Premio  Nezahualcóyotl de Literatura en Lenguas Indígenas) is a Mexican literary prize given to writers who create works in indigenous languages. The award was created in 1993. Arturo Arias of the University of Texas at Austin calls the award the "most prestigious literary award in Mexico and Latin America for indigenous writers." The prize has been awarded biennially since 2000 and includes a cash prize and a diploma.

Notable winners 
 Marisol Ceh Moo (Yukatek)
 Natalia Toledo (Zapotec)

References

External links 
 Official site

Mexican literary awards
Awards established in 1993
Literary awards honoring indigenous people